Palamède de Forbin (died 1508), seigneur of Solliès, nicknamed "the Great", was president of the Chambre des comptes and counsellor to René d'Anjou. He helped this prince decide to cede his estates to Louis XI.  Louis then became his master, and made him governor of Provence in 1481.

Notes and references

Palamède de Forbin
1508 deaths
15th-century French people
16th-century French people
Year of birth unknown